Toscotec is an Italian company specialized in the design and manufacture of plants and equipment for the production of tissue paper and paper board, as well as for stock preparation. This is a privately owned Italian group based in the province of Lucca, in Tuscany. Toscotec, whose head office is located in Marlia (LU), has branches in the United States and China - Toscotec North America in Green Bay, Wisconsin and Toscotec Paper Machine (Shanghai) Co., Ltd. in the Gaohang district of Shanghai.

History
Toscotec, originally named Officine Meccaniche Toschi, was founded in 1948 by Sergio Toschi as a service provider for paper mills in Tuscany. In the 1950s, the company began engineering and producing the first complete machine for paper manufacturing. It was the first company to manufacture dryer cylinders in steel instead of cast iron.

The name Officine Meccaniche Toschi was officially changed to Toscotec in 2003. In 2006 the Mennucci family became the sole shareholders of the company. 
At the beginning of 2012, Toscotec became full owner of Milltech, a company specialized in drying and energy solutions for the tissue industry, and consolidated its commercial and service network in the Far East through its associate Toscotec Paper Machine (Shanghai) Co., Ltd., in end 2012. In addition to their growth in Asia, the company has also had recent success in Russia  and South America.

Today, Toscotec operates with a group of companies, Toscotec Tech, which comprises the parent company and its affiliates Milltech and S.to.ri.

Corporate Structure
Toscotec is headed by Chairman Giovan Battista Mennucci and CEO Alessandro Mennucci. Members of the Mennucci family also sit on the Board of Directors.
Internally, the company has two divisions. The Tissue Division, which designs and engineers tissue machinery, plants and turnkey projects. The Paper & Board Division does turnkey project and refits existing paper production equipment.

See also
 Tissue paper
 Paperboard
 Paper mills
 Steel
 Cast iron
 Papermaking
 Converting
 Turnkey
 TAPPI

References

External links
Toscotec official website
Toscotec Facts & Figures
Milltech official website
Stori official website
Tecnologia & Passione official website
Industriali official website
Lucca Imprese
Camera di Commercio website
Tappi official website
It's Tissue official website
Toscotec's page on It's Tissue official website
LU.ME official website

Engineering companies of Italy
Industrial machine manufacturers
Manufacturing companies established in 1948
Italian companies established in 1948
Italian brands
Companies based in Tuscany